Black River Escarpment may refer to:

 Black River Escarpment (Ontario), marks the edge of the Canadian Shield, from Lake Huron to Lake Ontario.
 Black River Escarpment (Wisconsin), run parallel to the Niagara Escarpment, west of Lake Michigan.